Gaundi is a village in Kalewa Township, Kale District, in the Sagaing Region of western Burma. It lies on the Chindwin River to the south of Kalewa.

References

External links
Maplandia World Gazetteer

Populated places in Kale District
Kalewa Township